The Ramsar Convention on Wetlands of International Importance Especially as Waterfowl Habitat is an international treaty for the conservation and sustainable use of wetlands. Adopted in 1971, it entered into force in 1975 and as of April 2022 had 172 contracting parties. Japan was the twenty-fourth party to accede, on 17 October 1980.

Designated sites

See also
 Ramsar Convention
 List of Ramsar sites worldwide
 List of national parks of Japan
 Wildlife Protection Areas in Japan

References

External links

 Ramsar - Japan
 Ramsar sites in Japan

 
Protected areas of Japan
Environment of Japan
Japan